Soran is a South Korean indie rock band formed in 2009. They released their first extended play, Why Didn't I Know It Then?, in 2010, followed by the studio albums, Natural (2012), Prince (2013), and Cake (2016). They have also released the extend plays Polar (2017) and Share (2018).

The band consists of four members: Go Yeong-bae (vocals), Lee Tae-uk (guitar), Seo Myeon-ho (bass), and Pyeon Yu-il (drums).

Discography

Studio albums

Extended plays

Singles

Soundtrack appearances

References

External links 
 (in Korean)

South Korean rock music groups
South Korean indie rock groups
Musical groups established in 2009